Gilliéron is a French surname.  Notable people with this name include:

 Émile Gilliéron (1850–1924), Swiss artist and archaeological draftsman
 Jules Gilliéron (1854–1926), Swiss-French linguist and dialectologist
 Lauriane Gilliéron (born 1984), Swiss actress, model and beauty queen
 Louis Gilliéron (1909–?), Swiss field hockey player
 Peter Gilliéron (born 1953), Swiss lawyer and football official

French-language surnames